Walter Raleigh "Okey" Okeson (October 3, 1875 – November 4, 1943) was an American football player and coach.  He was a player-coach for the first all-professional football team, the Latrobe Athletic Association club in 1897. Okeson was the head football coach at Lehigh University in Bethlehem, Pennsylvania for one season, in 1900, compiling a record of 5–6.

Okeson was also an All-American end at Lehigh. In 1897 he was a player-coach for the Latrobe Athletic Association and led the team to a 10–2–1 record. He was later named to the "All Western Pennsylvania Team" by The Pittsburg Times after the season. In 1898, he played for the Duquesne Country and Athletic Club. At the end of that season, Okeson played for Duquesne against the 1898 Western Pennsylvania All-Star football team, formed by Latrobe manager Dave Berry. Duquesne won the game, 16–0.

Okeson was the chairman of the College Football Rules Committee for a time. He was also the editor for the 1933–1940 editions of Spalding's Foot Ball Guide. The 1934 edition of the Guide contained a "National Champion Foot Ball Teams" list compiled by football historian Parke H. Davis, who died before publication. As editor, Okeson was responsible for the subsequent additions to this list in the 1935 and 1936 editions of the Guide, which were then titled "Outstanding Nationwide and Sectional Teams" that were "Originally Compiled by the late Parke H. Davis."

In the 1939 Guide, Okeson wrote,
 

Okeson was elected to the Lehigh University Athletics Hall of Fame in 1999.

Head coaching record

College

References

External links
 

1875 births
1943 deaths
19th-century players of American football
American football ends
Player-coaches
Duquesne Country and Athletic Club players
Latrobe Athletic Association coaches
Latrobe Athletic Association players
Lehigh Mountain Hawks football coaches
Lehigh Mountain Hawks football players
People from Juniata County, Pennsylvania
Players of American football from Pennsylvania